Brian Jackson (1 April 1933 – 14 February 2020) was an English professional footballer of the 1950s. He scored 53 goals in 409 league and cup appearances in a 14-year career in the Football League.

An outside-right, he moved from Leyton Orient to Liverpool for £6,500 in November 1951. After playing  seven years at Anfield, he was sold on to Port Vale for £1,700 in July 1958. He helped the "Valiants" to win the Fourth Division title in 1958–59, before he was sold to Peterborough United for £2,000 in June 1962. He later played for Lincoln City, Burton Albion, and Boston United.

Career
Jackson began his career as an amateur with Arsenal, before he made 38 appearances in the Third Division South for Alec Stock's Leyton Orient in the 1950–51 season. He impressed in his creative performances at Brisbane Road, enough so that Liverpool manager Don Welsh paid £6,500 and part-exchanged Don Woan to bring the 18-year-old to the club in November 1951. He made his debut on 10 November 1951 at Anfield in a league match against Bolton Wanderers; Jackson's first goal for the club in the 61st minute was enough for the "Reds" to get a point from a 1–1 draw. He went on to tally up 15 First Division appearances in the 1951–52 season. However, he never really established himself in the Liverpool side, and featured only five times in the 1952–53 campaign. He scored four goals in 28 games in 1953–54, as Liverpool suffered relegation. He featured in 23 Second Division games in the 1954–55 campaign, before posting 15 appearances in 1955–56 and 19 appearances in 1956–57, as Liverpool twice finished in third place. He played 24 games in the 1957–58 campaign, as Phil Taylor's side finished two points short of promotion. His stay at Liverpool lasted for six and a half years and he managed 133 senior appearances, mostly in his preferred outside right position, never really establishing himself as a first-team regular.

In July 1958, he joined Port Vale for a £1,700 fee, as a replacement for recently sold winger Colin Askey. He scored eight goals in 38 games in the 1958–59 season, ad provided many assists as the "Valiants" won the Fourth Division title. He scored 11 goals in 53 appearances in the 1959–60 season, including Vale's consolation goal against Aston Villa in the FA Cup Fifth Round defeat at Vale Park. He went on to claim ten goals in 47 appearances in the 1960–61 campaign, as Vale rose to seventh in the league. He then scored seven goals in 42 games in the 1961–62 campaign, before manager Norman Low decided to sell him on to Jimmy Hagan's Peterborough United for £2,000 in June 1962. He helped Jack Fairbrother's "Posh" to finish sixth in the Third Division in 1962–63 and then tenth in 1963–64. Jackson left London Road for Bill Anderson's Fourth Division Lincoln City and succeeded Bud Houghton as club captain in September 1964. He departed the "Imps" at Sincil Bank for Peter Taylor's Southern League side Burton Albion. After leaving Eton Park, he later turned out for Boston United.

Style of play
Jackson was a pacey winger who excelled at providing crosses for the forwards, and also had good technical skills such as penalty taking.

Later life
After leaving the game, Jackson settled in the Ermine in Lincoln, and worked as a teacher, gardener and road worker until his retirement at the age of 65.

He had seven grandchildren, seven great grandchildren and six great great grandchildren

Career statistics
Source:

Honours
Port Vale
Football League Fourth Division: 1958–59

References

1933 births
2020 deaths
People from Walton-on-Thames
English footballers
Association football midfielders
Arsenal F.C. players
Leyton Orient F.C. players
Liverpool F.C. players
Port Vale F.C. players
Peterborough United F.C. players
Lincoln City F.C. players
Burton Albion F.C. players
Boston United F.C. players
English Football League players
Southern Football League players
Schoolteachers from Surrey
Schoolteachers from Lincolnshire